Handball competition of the 2017 Bolivarian Games in Santa Marta will be held from November 20 to 24 at the Coliseu Menor.

Participating teams

Men

Women

Medalists

Men's tournament

Round Robin
All times are local (UTC−05:00).

Final standing

Women's tournament

Round Robin
All times are local (UTC−05:00).

Final standing

References

External links
website of the 2017 Bolivarian Games

Handball
Bolivarian Games
2017 Bolivarian Games
2017 Bolivarian Games